Pence is an unincorporated community in Lewis County, Kentucky, United States.

Notes

Unincorporated communities in Lewis County, Kentucky
Unincorporated communities in Kentucky